In field theory, a branch of mathematics, the Stufe (/ʃtuːfə/; German: level) s(F) of a field F is the least number of squares that sum to −1. If −1 cannot be written as a sum of squares, s(F) = . In this case, F is a formally real field.  Albrecht Pfister proved that the Stufe, if finite, is always a power of 2, and that conversely every power of 2 occurs.

Powers of 2

If  then  for some natural number .

Proof: Let  be chosen such that . Let . Then there are  elements  such that

But since , we also have , and hence

and thus .

Positive characteristic
Any field  with positive characteristic has .

Proof: Let .

If  then , so .

If  consider the set  of squares.  is a subgroup of index  in the cyclic group  with  elements. Thus  contains exactly  elements, and so does .

Properties
The Stufe s(F) is related to the Pythagoras number p(F) by p(F) ≤  s(F) + 1.  If F is not formally real then s(F) ≤ p(F) ≤ s(F) + 1.  The additive order of the form (1), and hence the exponent of the Witt group of F is equal to 2s(F).

Examples
 The Stufe of a quadratically closed field is 1.
 The Stufe of an algebraic number field is ∞, 1, 2 or 4 (Siegel's theorem).  Examples are Q, Q(√−1), Q(√−2) and Q(√−7).
 The Stufe of a finite field GF(q) is 1 if q ≡ 1 mod 4 and 2 if q ≡ 3 mod 4.
 The Stufe of a local field of odd residue characteristic is equal to that of its residue field.  The Stufe of the 2-adic field Q2 is 4.

Notes

References

Further reading
 

Field (mathematics)